The School of Ss. Cyril and Methodius is an elementary/primary parochial located in Deer Park, New York.  The school was the inspiration of the Father James J. Behan, the first formal pastor of the adjoining church of the same name, Ss. Cyril and Methodius.  It opened in September 1962, staffed initially by the Sisters of Saint Joseph from Brentwood, New York.  The Sisters were associated with the original mission church in Deer Park when they instructed Sunday school.  The Mission of Ss. Cyril and Methodius consecrated its first sanctuary in 1934, receiving its patrons by settlers to the area of Slovak origins.

The first graduates of the school who continued their education at Catholic high schools attended Seton Hall High School - Patchogue, St. Anthony's - Smithtown, Chaminade - Uniondale, St. Joseph's - Brentwood and Holy Family - Huntington. Current graduates typically attend parochial secondary school at St. John the Baptist Diocesan High School in West Islip, New York, or St. Anthony's High School in South Huntington, New York.

Famous alumni include LeRoy Homer, the co-pilot of United Airlines Flight 93, and C. J. Ramone.

Schools in Suffolk County, New York
Private middle schools in New York (state)
Private elementary schools in New York (state)